Annandale State Primary School is a large school situated in the Townsville suburb of Annandale, Queensland, Australia. The suburb is located on the southern approaches to Townsville across the road from Lavarack Barracks and is also bordered by the Ross River.

Annandale was established in 1998 and boasts landscaped grounds surrounding fully air-conditioned buildings. All buildings are also cabled for Internet access. A major project during 2005/6 was the completion of a roof over the school's two basketball courts.

Julie Kornman served as the first principal of Annandale State school from its founding in 1998 until 2002. She laid the building blocks for the school's essential air-conditioning and internet fibre optics programs.

Annandale offers a wide-ranging curriculum for students from Prep to Year 6. Students complete four units of study per year and are grouped according to their age. Major foci for the next three years include the development of whole school approaches to Gifted Education, ICT, Literacy and Outcomes planning.

Students may also elect to participate in the school sport and music programs. Annandale participates in many sports including soccer, netball, rugby league, and hockey. Students may also elect to learn a musical instrument such as the violin, trumpet, flute, or drums.

References

Educational institutions established in 1998
Schools in Townsville
Public primary schools in Queensland
1998 establishments in Australia